Andreas Simonsen (born 8 October 1989) is a Swedish auto racing driver from Gothenburg, who mainly competed in the German GT championship.

Racing record

FIA GT Series results

References

External links
 
 

1989 births
Living people
Sportspeople from Gothenburg
Swedish racing drivers
Swedish Touring Car Championship drivers
Blancpain Endurance Series drivers
ADAC GT Masters drivers
24 Hours of Spa drivers
24H Series drivers
Phoenix Racing drivers
Charouz Racing System drivers
Nürburgring 24 Hours drivers